Modena Park 2017 was a concert performed by Italian rock singer Vasco Rossi on 1 July 2017 in Modena, Italy, to celebrate his 40 years of musical activity. Held at Enzo Ferrari Park, the event broke the world record for the most successful ticketed concert, with a total of 225,173 tickets sold (including 5,000 free tickets).

History

The last concert performed by Vasco in Modena dates back to 22 September 2001 during the Festa nazionale de l'Unità, on his Stupido Hotel tour.

On 19 April 2016, Vasco announced the organization of a concert in Modena, the city where he began his 40-year career as a DJ and singer. Initially, the event was to be called Modena... Modena park tutto ritorna (Modena... Modena Park all is back), in reference to lyrics of his song Colpa d'Alfredo (Alfredo's fault), in which a girl asks Vasco, "Mi puoi portare a casa questa sera? Abito fuori Modena, Modena park" ("Can you bring me home tonight? I'm living out of Modena... Modena Park"), but then she goes out with another man "who does not even speak Italian well, but – you see – he is well understood whenever he wants".

On 25 January 2017 ticket sales were opened to fan club members, who bought 33,112 tickets in 48 hours, and then two days later to the general public. On 27 January alone 150,000 tickets were sold in 10 hours, and at 8:13 PM Vasco announced on Twitter that he "Pulverized the European record!" The final block of 25,000 tickets was put on sale on 23 May, selling out within three hours.

Program
The concert began at 9:00 PM and included 40 songs by Vasco (one for each year of his career). The event ended after three and a half hours and concluded with the 1979 single Albachiara and a fireworks show.

Program:

Opening intro: Also sprach Zarathustra by Richard Strauss
Colpa d'Alfredo
Alibi
Blasco Rossi
Bollicine
Ogni volta
Anima fragile (with Gaetano Curreri)
Jenny
Silvia
La nostra relazione
Splendida giornata
Ieri ho sgozzato mio figlio
Rock medley: Delusa/T'immagini/Mi piaci perché/Gioca con me/Stasera!/Sono ancora in coma/Rock'n'roll Show
Ultimo domicilio conosciuto (with Maurizio Solieri)
Vivere una favola
Non mi va
Cosa vuoi da me
Siamo soli
Come nelle favole
Vivere
Sono innocente ma...
Rewind 
Liberi liberi
Interludio 2017 (with Andrea Braido)
Ed il tempo crea eroi
Acoustic medley: Una canzone per te/L'una per te/Ridere di te/Va bene, va bene così
Senza parole 
...stupendo
Gli spari sopra
Sballi ravvicinati del terzo tipo
C'è chi dice no
Un mondo migliore
I soliti
Sally
Un senso
Siamo solo noi
Band presentation by Diego Spagnoli
Vita spericolata
Canzone – dedicated to guitarist Massimo Riva (1963–1999)
Albachiara (with Andrea Braido, Gaetano Curreri, and Maurizio Solieri)
Closing credits: Die for Metal by Manowar

Band

 Vasco Rossi – vocals
 Stef Burns – electric guitar
 Claudio Golinelli – bass guitar
 Andrea Innesto – choir
 Matt Laug – drums
 Clara Moroni – choir
 Frank Nemola – trumpet, keyboard
 Vince Pastano – guitar
 Alberto Rocchetti – keyboard
 Diego Spagnoli – band presenter
 Andrea Braido – guitar (guest)
 Gaetano Curreri – piano (guest)
 Maurizio Solieri – guitar (guest)

Staging

Four of these were set on tracks, so that they could move sideways depending on the video scenography required during each song. The remaining four screens, two per side, were installed within PIT 3. Special effects were produced by 2,100 light points and 140 lasers. Transportation of all the staging equipment required a total of 136 semi-trailer trucks.

According to production staff, one megawatt of energy was consumed during the concert. The two main towers located in front of the stage, each containing 80 speaker modules, were suspended using two-ton cranes for each tower.

Audience

Over 220,000 tickets to the concert were sold, beating the previous world record of 198,000 paying attendees at the a-Ha concert at the Rock in Rio 2 festival on 26 January 1991. The arena was split into three areas: Pits 1 and 2 accommodated 30,000 attendees each, and Pit 3 seated the remainder. The areas were marked with different colours (red, blue, and green), and with different ticket prices (€75, €65, and €50, pre-sale fees and commissions excluded). The total gross for the concert was about €12 million (USD$13.7 million), while the economic impact on the city was estimated at €6 million.

Gate opening was initially scheduled for 09:00 on 1 July. However, considering the crowd that had arrived on the previous day, the police ordered the gates opened at 21:00 on 30 June, twenty-four hours before the concert began. One fan from Pordenone began camping in Modena on 29 May, a full month prior, in order to be the first person to enter the park.

Logistics
The national railroad company Trenitalia scheduled three special long-distance trains to depart from Rome, Turin/Milan, and Venice to the Modena railway station. After the concert, more than 35 trains were scheduled to depart. It was estimated that about 35,000 people reached Modena by train.

Broadcasting
The concert was broadcast live under the title Vasco Modena Park 01.07.17 – Live. Directed by Giuseppe Domingo Romano credited as Pepsy Romanoff, it was shown in 197 movie theaters in Italy and three sports venues (Genoa, Padua, and Rome). The concert was followed by official radio re-broadcasts on Radio Dimensione Suono and Radio Italia (at the national level), and Radio Bruno (at the local level). National television company RAI, unable to acquire the broadcasting rights for all the songs, aired on Eurovision on Rai 1 and Rai 1 HD the special program La notte di Vasco ("Vasco's night") by Paolo Bonolis, in addition to the programming of Rai Radio 2.

Vasco Modena Park - Il film
Pepsy Romanoff announced that the filming of the concert would be remastered in a live action film to be shown in Italian theaters at the beginning of December 2017 during the Christmas season, while the release of the DVD was scheduled for March–April 2018. For reasons of length (the documentary lasts 157 minutes, while the Modena concert was 3 and a half hours), several songs have been cut. In the five days of programming, the documentary was watched by 49,409 spectators and grossed €687,435, which exceeded the total revenue of the nine most scheduled films on the same day in Italy, and reached second place on the weekly chart of the most popular shows of the week. Afterwards, box office revenues rose to €743,153, between USD$848,058 and USD$849,124, against an estimated production budget of €500,000.

See also

List of highest-attended concerts

References

External links
 
 

2017 concerts
Italian music television series
2017 in Italian music
Culture in Modena